CC Rides Again is the second album by soul singer Chris Clark, released on 22 November 1969. It is the only album to be released on the Motown subsidiary label, Weed.

Track listing

Reception
Allmusic  [ link]

References

1969 albums